East Spotswood is an unincorporated community located within the borough of Spotswood in Middlesex County, New Jersey. Spotswood's East Spotswood Park and trackside memorial for the Camden and Amboy Railroad are located here. It had a passenger and freight station on the Pennsylvania Railroad, the United New Jersey Railroad and Canal Company subsidiary, which runs through the community.

References

Spotswood, New Jersey
Unincorporated communities in Middlesex County, New Jersey
Unincorporated communities in New Jersey